Storhøa is a mountain in Norway. The mountain peak is a tripoint on the border between the municipalities of Rauma (in Møre og Romsdal county) and Lesja and Skjåk (in Innlandet county). The mountain is surrounded by several other mountains including Trollkyrkja and Benkehøa to the west, Sponghøi to the south, and Digerkampen to the southeast.

See also
List of mountains of Norway

References

Rauma, Norway
Lesja
Skjåk
Mountains of Møre og Romsdal
Mountains of Innlandet